Saint-Coutant is a commune in the Deux-Sèvres department in western France.

See also
Communes of the Deux-Sèvres department

References

Bibliography
 Maurice Poignat, Le Pays mellois (Poitiers: Projet Editions, 1982. ) pp. 264–267

External links

 Church of Saint-Gilles and its tombstones (Saint-Coutant)
 Méridien Green French-English Association

Communes of Deux-Sèvres
Deux-Sèvres communes articles needing translation from French Wikipedia